The Apple Multimedia Lab was a pioneering electronic media research group operated by Apple Computer.  It was founded in 1987 by cognitive psychologist Kristina Hooper Woolsey and educational psychologist Sueann Ambron.

References

Multimedia
Communication design
Mass media companies of the United States